Roadsongs is the second live album by The Derek Trucks Band, released in 2010. The album features many songs off the band's most recent album, Already Free. The album was recorded over two nights in April 2009 at Chicago's Park West. For the album, The Derek Trucks Band was joined by a horn section consisting of Paul Garrett (Trumpet), Mace Hibbard (Saxophone), and Kevin Hyde (Trombone).

Reception

In a review for AllMusic, Thom Jurek stated that the album is "full of fire, grit, and jaw-dropping musical performances," and commented: "this is the most sonically satisfying live record Trucks has released to date. It's full of dynamics, beautiful separation, and warm, present sound while capturing the raw, spontaneous energy the band plays with live."

Writing for All About Jazz, Doug Collette noted that Roadsongs "accurately summarizes the evolution of The Derek Trucks Band over its sixteen-year existence," while Trucks "continues to grow as a brilliant soloist."

Randy Ray of Jambands.com called the album "another career-defining moment for the group," featuring "some of the DTB's most inspired playing." He remarked: "Continuing to defy expectations and cynical and jaded guitar-drenched ears, [Trucks] plays with a passionate fire, which is quite extraordinary, and fairly impossible to ignore."

Jason Rooks of Glide Magazine wrote: "This live recording captures the band fresh from the studio with increased energy and fluidness complete with Trucks' staggering solos and New Orleans style horn section... Roadsongs is a documented testament of The Derek Trucks Band's growth over the past 15 years."

In an article for Relix, Amy Jacques commented: "Trucks and company once again prove that they can lock into a funky groove and produce their own brand of energetic, eastern-influenced Southern rock, jazz and blues with scorching solos."

Vintage Guitar's John Heidt stated: "Part of the beauty of this band is its versatility. Funky, horn-driven soul music has become a staple of its sets... If Trucks keeps this band together for the long haul, it just may one day be seen as 'the next Allman Brothers.'"

Pete Pardo of Sea of Tranquility remarked: "It's rare that an album can grab your interest with spectacular musical/instrumental performances and at the same time have you singing along, swinging your hips and tapping your feet. Roadsongs is that CD folks, a daring musical journey that is also highly accessible and fun."

Vintage Rock's Shawn Perry wrote: "To hear DTB fire off an arsenal of their own fervent selection of originals in a mine field filled with classics melds the very core of Roadsongs and its job of spotlighting the very best from one of the very best."

Track listing

Disc 1

Disc 2

Personnel
 Derek Trucks – guitar
 Todd Smallie – bass, vocals
 Yonrico Scott – drums, vocals
 Kofi Burbridge – keyboards, flute, vocals
 Mike Mattison – lead vocals
 Count M'butu – percussion, vocals
 Mace Hibbard – tenor saxophone
 Paul Garrett – trumpet
 Kevin Hyde – trombone

References

2010 live albums
Derek Trucks live albums